Tarenna agumbensis is a species of plant in the family Rubiaceae. It is endemic to Karnataka in India.

References

agumbensis
Flora of Karnataka
Endangered plants
Taxonomy articles created by Polbot